Cortera, headquartered in Boca Raton, Florida, U.S., is a provider of credit information on businesses and corporations. The company provides business information with a database containing a number of private and public U.S. companies, analytics about each of those companies, and workflow software. Typical users include business analysts, sales and marketing experts and credit & collections professionals who need to research their prospects, customers, and partners. Principal customers include transportation providers, manufacturers and wholesalers, telcos, banks, and other credit and financial institutions.

History
Cortera was founded in 1993 as SRR Solutions by Northeastern University professor, Venkat Srinivasan, to provide credit & collections software. Over the years, the company raised tens of millions in venture capital funding, dabbled with the creation of an online B2B debt exchange and changed its name to eCredit in 1998. In December 2006 the company was acquired by an investment group that ultimately included Fidelity Ventures, Battery Ventures, and CIBC. The company name was changed from eCredit to Cortera in early 2008.

Moody's Analytics acquired Cortera in 2021.

Products and services
Business information
Credit & Collections software
Analytics
 B2B Payment Data

Partners
The company primarily partners with other providers of business information to include their information in its software. Partners include:
Bureau van Dijk
Moodys Analytics
 LexisNexis Risk Solutions

References

External links
Official website

Business services companies established in 1993
Business services companies of the United States
Companies based in Boca Raton, Florida
Companies based in Dedham, Massachusetts